Ang Iglesia ni Cristo is the first religious television program produced by the international Christian religious organization Iglesia ni Cristo (through the Christian Era Broadcasting Service International) and its currently broadcast by INC TV (DZCE-TV) and Net 25. The program premiered on February 13, 1983 on MBS (now known as PTV 4) and RPN 9, along with City 2 Television (reverted to BBC-2) from the same year until 1986 when BBC-2 was signed off after EDSA Revolution. One of its first panelists of the program was Bro. Eduardo V. Manalo which he's now a current executive minister of the church. After the People Power Revolution, the program transferred to Radio Philippines Network. It later aired on ABS-CBN in 1990. When Net 25 was launched, most of its INC programs (including "Iglesia ni Cristo") began to air on the said network.

Ang Iglesia ni Cristo was also aired when Iglesia ni Cristo (through its religious broadcast arm, Christian Era Broadcasting Service) established its own TV network, GEM TV in 2005 and it later replaced by INC TV in October 2012.

References

Philippine religious television series
People's Television Network original programming
Radio Philippines Network original programming
ABS-CBN original programming
1983 Philippine television series debuts
Iglesia ni Cristo
Filipino-language television shows